Alan Aylesworth Macnaughton,  (July 30, 1903 – July 16, 1999) was a Canadian parliamentarian and Speaker of the House of Commons of Canada from 1963 to 1966.

Macnaughton was born in Greater Napanee, Ontario, and educated at Upper Canada College. He studied law at McGill University (BCL 1929) and began a law practice in Montreal where he served as a Crown Attorney from 1933 to 1942.

Macnaughton first won a seat in the House of Commons of Canada in the 1949 election when he was returned as a Liberal Member of Parliament (MP) for the riding of Mount Royal. Macnaughton served as Chairman of the Public Accounts Committee after the 1958 election, and his performance in that position led to the newly elected Liberal government nominating him for the position of Speaker following the 1963 election.

Macnaughton presided over a House of Commons led by a minority government in which no party had control of the House, resulting in long and bitter debates that made it a challenge for any Speaker to maintain order.

Acrimonious debates included that over the adoption of a new Canadian flag as well as the Munsinger Affair and other scandals. As Speaker, he attempted to bring in procedural reforms to make Parliament more efficient. He established four subcommittees of the Special Committee on Procedure and Organization, each chaired by a member of a different political party.

The result of this process were recommendations for new procedures of time allocation in debates, a new committee structure, the abolition of the right to appeal rulings of the Speaker, research budgets for members and other changes most of which were ultimately implemented.  
 
During the Flag Debate, Macnaugton set a precedent by allowing the motion to be split into two and allowing separate motions on making the Maple Leaf the new flag and using the Union Flag as a symbol of Canada's membership in the Commonwealth of Nations. This was the first time a Speaker took it upon his own authority to split a motion. Macnaughton did so in the hope of facilitating debate and calming the House.

Late in his term as Speaker, he served as a production consultant on the politically-themed CBC Television drama series Quentin Durgens, M.P..

Macnaughton did not contest the 1965 election, and retired from electoral politics. He was succeeded as MP for Mount Royal by Pierre Trudeau.

In 1966, Macnaughton was appointed to a seat in the Senate of Canada by Lester B. Pearson, and served in that body until his retirement in 1978. In 1994, he was made an Officer of the Order of Canada.

In 1967, MacNaughton founded World Wildlife Fund Canada (WWF-Canada), which is the Canadian branch of the global conservation organization, World Wide Fund for Nature (formerly named World Wildlife Fund).

Archives 
There is an Alan Macnaughton fonds at Library and Archives Canada.

References

External links
 

1903 births
1999 deaths
Canadian Anglicans
Canadian senators from Quebec
Liberal Party of Canada senators
Officers of the Order of Canada
Speakers of the House of Commons of Canada
Members of the King's Privy Council for Canada
People from Lennox and Addington County
Upper Canada College alumni
McGill University Faculty of Law alumni